is a passenger railway station  located in the city of  Takarazuka Hyōgo Prefecture, Japan. It is operated by the private transportation company Hankyu Railway.It is located near JRA Hanshin Racecourse and Kwansei Gakuin University. It is also an entrance station to Mount Kabutoyama, the east end of the Rokkō Mountains.

Lines

Layout
The station consists of two opposed ground-level side platforms, with an addition side platform on the inbound line in the direction of Nishinomiya Kitaguchi. Each platform is connected by underground passages in two places, north and south, connecting to two ticket gates, east and west. The main entrance is the east ticket gate, which has a window, an automatic ticket vending machine, a shop, and a toilet. Since it is also the exit for the racecourse, there are many automatic ticket gates, The additional side platform has its own temporary ticket gate,

Platforms

Adjacent stations

History
Nigawa Station opened on December 28, 1923. The name 'Nigawa' is originally the name of the river on the border of Takarazuka city and Nishinomiya city, and today Nigawa is used as the name of a town along the river of both cities. During the times of World War II (12/15/1943 - 9/21/1945), there was a station between Nigawa and Obayashi named . The station was in front of the factory of Kawanishi Aircraft Company, a predecessor of ShinMaywa Industries, Ltd. The factory was closed after GHQ ordered the company to stop manufacturing aircraft. In 1949, JRA Hanshin Racecourse was built on the vacant lot. In 2002, the station installed barrier-free facilities for the elderly and the disabled.

Passenger statistics
In fiscal 2019, the station was used by an average of 24,998 passengers daily

Surrounding area
Hanshin Racecourse
Kwansei Gakuin University 
Kwansei Gakuin Junior High School
Kwansei Galuin Senior High School
Nigawa Gakuin
ShinMaywa

See also
List of railway stations in Japan

References

External links

Nigawa Station (Hankyu Railway) 

Railway stations in Hyōgo Prefecture
Hankyu Railway Imazu Line
Stations of Hankyu Railway
Railway stations in Japan opened in 1923
Takarazuka, Hyōgo